Hsieh Cheng-peng (born 22 September 1991) is an inactive tennis player from Taiwan. Alongside Yang Tsung-hua he won the 2008 Wimbledon Championships – Boys' doubles title. He won the 2009 US Open – Boys' doubles with Márton Fucsovics, as well as the 2008 Australian Open – Boys' doubles title with Yang Tsung-hua and the 2009 Australian Open – Boys' doubles title with Francis Casey Alcantara.

He is the brother of tennis players Hsieh Su-wei and Hsieh Yu-chieh.

Tennis career

Juniors
In 2008 Hsieh won the 2008 Wimbledon Championships – Boys' doubles alongside Yang Tsung-hua. In 2009 he won the Australian Open Boys' Doubles alongside Francis Casey Alcantara and the US Open Boys' Doubles together with Hungarian Márton Fucsovics. Hsieh compiled a doubles win–loss record of 124–33 (69-44 in singles) and reached a career-high of No. 8 in the ITF Junior combined world rankings in April 2009.

Junior Slam results – Singles:

Australian Open: QF (2009)
French Open: 1R (2009)
Wimbledon: 2R (2009)
US Open: 1R (2008, 2009)

Junior Slam results – Doubles:

Australian Open: W (2008, 2009)
French Open: QF (2008)
Wimbledon: W (2008)
US Open: W (2009)

Pro tour
Hsieh has won 20 Challenger titles in doubles, reaching a career-high doubles ranking of world No. 62 in June 2019.

ATP career finals

Doubles: 1 runner-up

Challenger and Futures finals

Doubles: 54 (36–18)

References

External links
 
 

Australian Open (tennis) junior champions
Taiwanese male tennis players
US Open (tennis) junior champions
Wimbledon junior champions
Universiade medalists in tennis
Living people
1991 births
Tennis players at the 2018 Asian Games
Universiade gold medalists for Chinese Taipei
Universiade silver medalists for Chinese Taipei
Universiade bronze medalists for Chinese Taipei
People from Hsinchu
Asian Games competitors for Chinese Taipei
Grand Slam (tennis) champions in boys' doubles
Medalists at the 2011 Summer Universiade
Medalists at the 2017 Summer Universiade